Mubarak Saeed Waleed Esmaeel Al-Shehhi (born 18 October 1991), or simply Mubarak Saeed, is an Emirati professional footballer who plays for Al-Taawon as a defender for the United Arab Emirates national team.

External links

References

Emirati footballers
1991 births
Living people
Emirates Club players
Al-Nasr SC (Dubai) players
Al-Ittihad Kalba SC players
Al-Taawon (UAE) Club players
UAE First Division League players
UAE Pro League players
Association football defenders
United Arab Emirates international footballers